Issa Ayupovich Kodzoev (born 12 August 1938 in Tarskoye, Prigorodny District, Checheno-Ingush ASSR) is an Ingush writer, poet, playwright, teacher and politician.

Work

in Ingush 
 Дувцараш, 1990
 Хьасани, Хьусени, Анжела яха хоза йиIиги, 2001 
 Вешта аьлча, 2003
 КIантий дегаш, 2003 
 ГIалгIай — epic novel (2001-2013)
 Магате-Фаьрате, 2001 
 ГIалгIай Лоаме, 2001
 Зоазо, 2004
 Дадеков, 2006
 Мехка гIонча, 2010
 Ивизда ГIазд, 2011
 Аьже Ахк, 2013

in Russian 
 Казахстанский дневник
 Над бездной, 2006
 Обвал, 2009
 Сердца отважных
 Сулумбек Сагопшинский, 2011
 Джамбулат и другие

References

1938 births
Living people
Ingush people
Ingush language
Russian writers
Russian translators